The Green City Market is a 501 (c)(3) not-for-profit organization that operates a farmers market in Chicago focusing on local and sustainable farming practices. Green City Market is Chicago's only year-round, sustainable market.

Green City Market was started in 1998 by chef, cookbook author, and Chicago Tribune columnist Abby Mandel. 

Green City Market operates as an outdoor market in the south end of Lincoln Park from May through October. From November through April, Green City Market moves into the Peggy Notebaert Nature Museum.

In 2007, Alice Waters named Green City Market one of America's ten best farmer's markets.

See also
Chicago farmers' markets

References
 "Green City Market founder Abby Mandel dies."
 "10 great markets to cultivate organic farmers."

External links 
 Website

Cuisine of Chicago
Farmers' markets in the United States